Top Model, cycle 1 was the first cycle of the Norwegian adaptation of Top Model. It aired on TV3 from September to November 2006. The winner of the competition was 16-year-old Maria Eilertsen from Stavanger.

Contestants
(ages stated are at start of contest)

Summaries

Call-out order

 The contestant was eliminated
 The contestant won the competition

Photo Shoot Guide
Episode 2 Photoshoot: Makeover Shoot
Episode 3 Photoshoot: Bikini BonAqua Shoot
Episode 4 Photoshoot: Beauty Shot with Glasses
Episode 5 Photoshoot: Lingerie Shoot
Episode 6 Photoshoot: Shoot in the Rain
Episode 7 Photoshoot: Shoot on a Boat
Episode 8 Photoshoot: Galla Shot
Episode 9 Photoshoot: Jungle Shoot with Snake
Episode 10 Photoshoot: Brides on the Road
Episode 11 Photoshoot: Ballerinas
Episode 12 Photoshoot: Galla Shot

Judges
Kathrine Sørland 
Hervé Bernard 
Sunniva Stordal 
 Mette Mortensen

References

External links
Official site (Norwegian)
Norway's Next Top Model at the Internet Movie Database

Top Model Norge
2000s Norwegian television series
2006 Norwegian television series debuts
2006 Norwegian television seasons